Saint Antoninus of Piacenza (or Placentia) (died 303 AD) is a patron saint of  Piacenza in Italy. He is venerated as a saint and martyr in the Roman Catholic Church, with a feast day of 30 September.

The saint was said to have been martyred at Piacenza or Travo, in the 303 AD Diocletianic Persecution. He appears in Victricius' De Laude Sanctorum of the same century, and the somewhat later Martyrologium Hieronymianum. Sabinus of Piacenza established his sanctuary, following a rediscovery of the relics. A later tradition made him a member of the legendary Theban Legion. Piacenza's Basilica di Sant'Antonino bears his name.

References

3rd-century births
303 deaths
4th-century Christian martyrs
Italian Roman Catholic saints
People from Piacenza
Christians martyred during the reign of Diocletian